Creative Writer is a word processor released by Microsoft Kids in 1993. Using this program, which is specifically targeted at children, it is possible to create documents such as letters, posters, flyers and stories complete with different fonts, Clip art, WordArt and effects. The interface and environment is especially targeted towards children and is set in Imaginopolis with the main helper being a character known as McZee. A sequel, Creative Writer 2, was released in 1996. Both are now discontinued, but can still be acquired from online stores and auction websites such as eBay.

The original Creative Writer was announced by Microsoft on 7 December 1993  and was released in 1994. It ran on both MS-DOS 3.2 and the
Windows 3.1 operating system. A version was also released for the Apple Macintosh, compatible with computers running the classic Mac OS from the System 6 version up to Mac OS 9.

The program took place in the fictional place of Imaginopolis and had several levels of a building each with a different topic (e.g. one for plain writing, one for story templates, one for poster templates). The design of the program was very similar to that of its sister program Fine Artist. The program runs full screen and creates an all-inclusive environment. The interface was similar to a later product called Microsoft Bob.

Creative Writer featured many of the features found on Microsoft's Word for Windows product, including the WordArt feature used to create titles and headlines and the ability to add clip art. Creative Writer also used sounds heavily where each tool would make a different noise. Examples of this include a vacuum cleaner suction to delete and an explosion to denote deleting everything from a page.

File formats
Creative Writer and its sequel Creative Writer 2 both use different versions of the proprietary .max file format.  This file format does not open in other word processors such as Word. Files created in Creative Writer can be viewed in Creative Writer 2 but files saved using Creative Writer 2 will not open correctly in Creative Writer. Creative Writer was also able to open .doc files kept in a location known as "Outside Of Imaginopolis".

Expansion pack
An expansion pack, titled Ghostwriter Mysteries for Creative Writer, was released in 1994 by Microsoft Kids.  It featured elements from the Ghostwriter TV series, including the show's team members and ten different mysteries to solve.  It requires Creative Writer.

See also 
 Creative Writer 2
 Fine Artist
 Microsoft Home

References 

Discontinued Microsoft software
Microsoft franchises
Classic Mac OS software